The São Mateus River is a river primarily in Espírito Santo state in eastern Brazil.

Course
The São Mateus River rises in the Brazilian state of Minas Gerais in the municipality of São Félix de Minas, where it is known as Braço Sul do Rio São Mateus (the southern branch) or Rio Cricaré. Its principal tributary is the Cotoxé River (or northern branch), which also arises in Minas Gerais near the source of the southern branch, in an area called "Alto São Mateus". In addition, other rivers such as the São Domingos, the Santana, the  
Mariricu, and the Rio Prêto are part of the São Mateus River's hydrological system.

See also
List of rivers of Espírito Santo

Notes

External links
 

Rivers of Espírito Santo